Gleneagles Hospital Penang (GPG) is a tertiary care private hospital in George Town, Penang island, Malaysia.  It was established in July 1973. The hospital houses over 85 doctors which cover a wide array of medical specialties,  supported by more than 1,100 employees (nurses, allied health personnel and support staff). The hospital has a bed capacity of 360. The hospital now consists of its original six-storey building and a 19-storey annex.

History 
The Gleneagles Hospital Penang was established in 1973 and was originally a three-storey hospital with 70 beds. It was located at the junction of Jalan Cantonment and Jalan Bell. The hospital was subsequently expanded to six floors in 1977, housing 132 beds. In 1989, Parkway Pantai, a Singapore-listed healthcare firm, acquired the majority control of the hospital, which was then renamed the Gleneagles Medical Centre. The hospital was expanded again in 2013, with the completion of a 19-storey annex. Today it is known as Gleneagles Hospital Penang and accommodates 360 beds. The CEO of Gleneagles Hospital Penang is Mr. Ivan Loh.

Gleneagles Hospital Penang is one of 16 hospitals operated by Pantai Holdings Sdn Bhd (Pantai Group), which is part of Parkway Pantai Limited, a subsidiary of IHH Healthcare Berhad (IHH).

Facilities and services 
Gleneagles Hospital Penang's medical services include the following specialties.

 24-hour Emergency Department
 Cancer Centre 
 Heart Centre
 Orthopaedic Centre
 ESWL / Stone Treatment Centre
 Gastrointestinal Diagnostics
 Minimally Invasive Surgery
 Imaging
 Neurophysiology Laboratory
 Radiotherapy Centre
 Scope Centre 
 Weight Management Centre
 Cardiac Catheterization Laboratory
 Cardiac Diagnostic Unit 
 Intensive Care Unit (ICU)
 Labour & Delivery Suite
 Operating Theatre with Laminar Flow
 Pharmacy
 Rehabilitation Centre
 Online services, eHealthChat and eHealthConsult

See also
 Gleneagles Hospital Kota Kinabalu
 Gleneagles Hospital Kuala Lumpur

References 

Buildings and structures in George Town, Penang
Hospitals in Penang
Hospitals established in 1973